Howell de Francis (birth unknown – death unknown) was a Welsh professional rugby league footballer who played in the 1900s and 1910s. He played at representative level for Wales, and at club level for Bradford Northern and Wigan, as a forward (prior to the specialist positions of), during the era of contested scrums.

Background
Howell de Francis was born in Port Talbot, Wales, abt 1883.
In 1911 he was a lodger in the house of George and Matilda Scott at 17,Kimberley St Wigan,

Playing career

International honours
Howell de Francis won caps for Wales while at Wigan in 1908 against New Zealand, and in 1909 against England.

Championship final appearances
Howell de Francis played as a forward, i.e. number 10, in Wigan's 7-3 victory over Oldham in the Championship Final during the 1908–09 season at The Willows, Salford on Saturday 1 May 1909.

County Cup Final appearances
Howell de Francis played as a forward, i.e. number 12, and scored a try in Wigan's 22-5 victory over Leigh in the 1909 Lancashire County Cup Final during the 1909–10 season at Wheater's Field, Broughton, on Saturday 27 November 1909.

Club career
Howell de Francis was considered a "Probable" for the 1910 Great Britain Lions tour of Australia and New Zealand, but ultimately he was not selected for the tour.

Note
In some references, Howell de Francis' surname is stated as being just Francis, i.e. the "de" is omitted.

References

External links
Statistics at wigan.rlfans.com
Search for "Howell de Francis" at britishnewspaperarchive.co.uk
Search for "Howell Francis" at britishnewspaperarchive.co.uk

Bradford Bulls players
Place of death missing
Rugby league forwards
Rugby league players from Aberavon
Wales national rugby league team players
Welsh rugby league players
Wigan Warriors players
Year of birth missing
Year of death missing